Retention ratio indicates the percentage of a company's earnings that are not paid out in dividends but credited to retained earnings. It is the opposite of the dividend payout ratio, so that also called the retention rate.

Retention Ratio = 1 − Dividend Payout Ratio = Retained Earnings / Net Income

The payout ratio is the amount of dividends the company pays out divided by the net income. This formula can be rearranged to show that the retention ratio plus payout ratio equals 1, or essentially 100%. That is to say that the amount paid out in dividends plus the amount kept by the company comprises all of net income.

Corporate finance